Zydus Lifesciences Limited, formerly known as Cadila Healthcare Limited, is an Indian multinational pharmaceutical company headquartered in Ahmedabad, which is primarily engaged in the manufacture of generic drugs. The company ranked 100th in the Fortune India 500 list in 2020.

History 
Cadila was founded in 1952 by Ramanbhai Patel (1925–2001), formerly a lecturer in the L.M. College of Pharmacy, and his business partner Indravadan Modi. It evolved over the next four decades into an established pharmaceutical company.

In 1995 the Patel and Modi families split; the Modi family's share was moved into a new company called Cadila Pharmaceuticals Ltd., and Cadila Healthcare Ltd became the Patel family's holding company. Cadila Healthcare had its initial public offering on the Bombay Stock Exchange in 2000 as stock code 532321.

In 2015 the company acquired another Indian pharmaceutical company called German Remedies. On 25 June 2007, the company acquired Química e Farmacêutica Nikkho do Brasil Ltda (Nikkho) as part of Zydus Healthcare Brasil Ltda.

In 2010, Cadila Healthcare received a Wellcome Trust Award under the "R&D for Affordable Healthcare in India" initiative.

In 2014, Cadila Healthcare launched the world's first adalimumab biosimilar under the brand name Exemptia at one-fifth the originator's price.
Zydus Cadila Healthcare has also launched its first research based drug molecule Saroglitazar in treatment of Diabetic Dyslipidemia under brand name "Lipaglyn". SoviHep is the first sofosbuvir brand launched in India by Zydus in year 2015.

In 2019, injectable ketorolac tromethamine manufactured by Zydus (Cadila Healthcare) was recalled due to microbial growth.

In 2020, Zydus Cadila's drug Desidustat received approval by the USFDA to initiate clinical trials on cancer patients.

In 2022 Cadila Healthcare Ltd., is renamed as Zydus Lifesciences Ltd.

Products 
From twenty-five pharmaceutical production operations in India and Zydus Cadila develops and manufactures an extensive range of pharmaceuticals as well as diagnostics, herbal products, skincare products and other OTC products. Starting from late 2015, having concluded a voluntary license agreement with Gilead, the company also produces the generics for hepatitis C treatment (i.e. sofosbuvir, distributed under the brand name SoviHep).

The company makes active pharmaceutical ingredients at four sites in India, Ankleshwar plants, Vadodara plant, and Ahmedabad plant.

COVID-19 vaccine development
In July 2020, the company got permission to conduct human trials of the developmental COVID-19 vaccine named ZyCoV-D, from the Drugs Controller General of India (DCGI), Government of India. On 20 August 2021, DCGI granted emergency use approval of ZyCoV-D.

Cadila is also among the several Indian pharma companies that received the licensing agreements from the Gilead Sciences to produce remdesivir.

Corporate control 
Zydus Cadila's major shareholder remains the Patel family. Pankaj Patel (born 1953), son of the founder, is the chairman of the company. In 2004, Pankaj Patel was included in Forbes' annual list of India's richest people. As of 2020, Forbes estimates Patel's net worth at US$3.9 billion, making him India's 46th richest person.

References

External links
 

Pharmaceutical companies of India
Manufacturing companies based in Ahmedabad
Health care companies of India
Pharmaceutical companies established in 1952
1952 establishments in Bombay State
Indian companies established in 1952
Companies listed on the National Stock Exchange of India
Companies listed on the Bombay Stock Exchange
COVID-19 vaccine producers
Companies based in Ahmedabad